Alisa Stomakhina (born 20 June 2002) is a Russian-born figure skater who competes internationally for Austria. She is a two-time Austrian junior champion (2016 & 2017), and she competed at the 2018 World Championships.

Career 
Stomakhina began competing at the junior level during the 2015-2016 season. She received one assignment on the Junior Grand Prix to the Cup of Austria where she finished 25th. She won the gold medal at the 2016 Cup of Tyrol in the junior division. She won the gold medal in the junior level at the 2015-2016 Austrian National Championships.

Stomakhina began the 2016-2017 season at the 2016 CS Lombardia Trophy where she finished 10th in the junior division. She received one assignment on the Junior Grand Prix to the Ljubljana Cup where she finished 15th. She won the gold medal at the 2016 Open d'Andorra. At the 2016-2017 Austrian National Championships, Stomakhina won the gold medal at the junior level and the silver medal at the senior level behind Kerstin Frank. She defended her gold medal at the 2017 Cup of Tyrol. She competed at the 2017 World Junior Championships where she finished 40th.

Stomakhina began competing at the senior level during the 2017-2018 season. She finished 4th at the 2018 Sofia Trophy. She competed at the 2018 World Championships where she finished 30th. She finished 4th at the 2018 Egna Trophy. During the 2018-2019 season, she finished 6th at the 2019 Sofia Trophy.

During the 2019-2020 season, Stomakhina finished 5th at the 2019 Tirnavia Ice Cup. She competed at the 2019 Open d'Andorra where she finished 9th in the short program, but she withdrew from the competition before the free skate.

References

External links 

 
 

2002 births
Living people
Austrian female single skaters
Figure skaters from Vienna
Figure skaters from Moscow